Alfred George Fischer (December 12, 1920 – July 2, 2017) was a German-American geologist.

Life and work

Fischer comes from a German-American family and was born and partly grew up in Germany. In 1935, at the age of 15, he moved to the US and attended college in Watertown, Wisconsin. He studied geology at the University of Wisconsin, where he was awarded a bachelor's degree in 1939 and a master's degree in 1940.

From 1941-1943 he worked at the Virginia Polytechnic Institute. In 1943-44 he was a geologist for Stanolind Oil and Gas in Kansas and from 1944 to 1946 a geologist in Florida. In 1947 he taught at the University of Rochester and from 1948 at the University of Kansas, where he was an assistant professor. In 1950 he gained a doctorate at Columbia University.

For five years from 1951 to 1956 he was a petroleum geologist (Senior Geologist) for Esso in Peru before becoming assistant professor in 1956 and professor in 1963 at Princeton University. In 1984 he was appointed professor at the University of Southern California in Los Angeles, becoming emeritus professor in 1991. He was also a visiting professor in Innsbruck, Tübingen and Berlin.

Fischer studied marine sedimentology and marine fossil fauna and was a leading scientist in the Deep Sea Drilling Project. He described in 1964 the phenomenon of rhythmically recurring sequences of sedimentary rock layers in some Keuper formations of the Alps, first discovered in Dachsteinkalken in the province of Salzburg. In the 1970s, he propagated the existence of global biorhythms in the fossil record and in 1977 the concept of cycles of low and high levels of biodiversity in the marine fauna over 32 million years. In 1982 he spoke in favour of the Earth's climate alternating between ice ages and warm periods due to the (Icehouse-Greenhouse concept).

Honors and awards
2009 Mary Clark Thompson Medal
1994 Elected member of the US National Academy of Sciences
1992 Gustav-Steinmann-Medaille for his pioneering insights into the rhythms of life and the Earth's climate.
1992 Lyell Medal
1982 William H. Twenhofel Medal
1972 Leopold-von-Buch-Plakette award of the German Geological Society
1969 Guggenheim Fellowship

He is a member of the American Association for the Advancement of Science. He holds honorary doctorates from the University of Tübingen.

Publications
 The Lofer cyclothems of the alpine Triassic, Kansas State Geol. Surv. Bull. 169, Vol 1, 1964, pp 107–150.
  Gilbert—bedding rhythms and geochronology, in Ellis Yochelson (Hrsg.) The Scientific Ideas of G. K. Gilbert, Geol. Soc. Am. Spec. Papers 183, 1980, pp 93–104.
  Climatic oscillations in the biosphere, in M. Nitecki (Herausgeber) Biotic Crises in Ecological and Evolutionary Time, Academic Press, New York, 1981, pp 103–131.
  Climatic rhythms recorded in strata, Annual Reviews, Earth and Planetary Science, Vol 14, 1981, pp 351–367
  with D. J. Bottjer, Orbital forcing and sedimentary sequences, Journal of Sedimentary Petrology, Vol 61, 1991, pp 1063–1069
  with M. A. Arthur, Secular variations in the pelagic realm, in H. E. Cook, P. Enos (Hrsg.) Deep Water Carbonate Environments, Soc. Econ. Paleontol. Mineral. Spec. Publ. 25, 1977, pp 18–50
  with T. D. Herbert, Stratification-rhythms. Italo-American Studies in the Umbrian facies, Memoria della Societa Geologica Italiana, Vol 31, 1986, pp 45–51
  with T. D. Herbert, Milankovitch climatic origin of the mid-cretaceous black-shale rhythms in Central Italy, Nature, Vol 321, 1986, pp 739–743
  Orbital cyclicity in mesozoic strata, in G. Einsele, W. Ricken, A. Seilacher Cycles and events in stratigraphy, Springer 1991, pp 48–62
   Long term climatic oscillations recorded in stratigraphy, in Climate in Earth History: Studies in Geophysics, National Academy of Sciences Press 1982, Online
    Fischer, S. Honjo, Garrison Electron micrographs of limestones and their nannofossils, Princeton University Press 1967
    Fischer, Garrison, Carbonate lithification on the sea floor, J. Geology, Vol 75, 1976, pp 488–496

References

1920 births
2017 deaths
American geologists
Gustav-Steinmann-Medaille winners
German emigrants to the United States
Princeton University faculty
University of Southern California faculty
Fellows of the American Association for the Advancement of Science
Members of the United States National Academy of Sciences
Lyell Medal winners